Guniangqiao is a metro station on Line 5 of Hangzhou Metro and Line 1 of Shaoxing Metro in China. It is located in Xiaoshan District, Hangzhou.

It is the eastern terminus of Hangzhou Metro Line 5 and the western terminus of Shaoxing Metro Line 1.

References

Railway stations in Zhejiang
Railway stations in China opened in 2020
Hangzhou Metro stations
Shaoxing Metro